Patrick Cavelan (born 24 November 1976) is a French professional football manager,

Career
Until 2011 he was a coach of the Golden Star. Since 2011 until 2013 he coached the Martinique national football team.

References

External links

Profile at Soccerpunter.com

1976 births
Living people
French football managers
Martinique national football team managers
Place of birth missing (living people)